Dragan Djukic (born 9 August 1962 in Arandjelovac) is a Serbian handball coach. During his coaching career worked with famous handball clubs like:
 "CSM“ Bucharest (Romania)
 "Vardar" Skopje (North Macedonia)
 "Pick" Szeged (Hungary)
 "Red Star" Belgrade (Serbia)
 "Metaloplastika" Sabac (Serbia)  
As well as the National Teams of Montenegro, Israel, Great Britain, Switzerland, North Macedonia.  

With the National Team of Great Britain took part at London 2012 Olympic Games and with Montenegro participated at the European Championship in Croatia 2018.

Handball Academy, Book and Seminars 
Conceptual initiator, founder, and organizer of the project: "Handball 4All" a unique program of individual handball education for young players and coaches from all over the world, running from 2011 in Serbia.  

In 2020, he published a very successful handball book on the principles of defense 3:2:1, entitled: "3:2:1 - Back to basics". 

Held Seminars and Lectures in Serbia, Portugal, Hungary, Switzerland, Greece, Great Britain, Israel, North Macedonia, Turkey, Montenegro, Tunisia, Japan and Slovakia, on different handball related topics. As a lecturer participated in the Master Coach courses of the Handball Federations of Poland, Croatia, Greece, Israel, and Italy.

From April 2022 he became an official Lecturer of European Handball Federation (EHF Expert)

Education 
Graduated from the Faculty of Physical Education in Novi Sad (Serbia), finished a Master's study at the Faculty of Sport in Belgrade (Serbia). 

He is a certified Master Coach (since 2014) of the European Handball Federation (the highest education for handball coaches).

In 2018, finished a Master's study at EHF/University Las Palmas (Spain). He was part of the 1st generation of Academic EHF Master Coaches..

Coaching career 
In the period from 1987 to 2001 he was hired as a coach of various junior selections of Yugoslavia, Serbia and Montenegro and Serbia. Through his work, he played a role in the becoming of several young players everywhere he worked: Ivan Lapčević ("Zupa"), Danijel Anđelković ("Kolubara"), Nikola Eklemović and Daniel Buday (Pick Szeged), Carlos Carneiro ("Madeira SAD"), Andy Schmid (Swiss National Team) etc. 

In addition, in the same period he was the coach of several clubs in Serbia: 

 "Zupa" Aleksandrovac 1986-1993 and 1994/95. 
 "Metaloplastika" Sabac 1993/94, 
 RK "Kolubara" Lazarevac 1995-1997, 
 ZORK "Napredak" Krusevac 1997/98, 
 "Sever Kozateks" Subotica 1998/99, and 
 "Red Star" Belgrade 1999/00. 

In December 2000, he became the coach of the Hungarian club Pick Szeged, and remained there until June 2003, when he went to Macedonia and worked as a coach of "Vardar Vatrostalna" Skopje (2003-2005) and as a national coach of the Macedonian national team (2003/04).  Season 2005/2006 he took over the Portuguese club Madeira SAD from Funchal. 

In the period from 2006 to 2008, he was the national coach of Switzerland.

In April 2009, Djukic succeeded Carsten Albrektsen as the head coach of the national team of Great Britain with the goal of forming a team for the 2012 Olympic Handball Tournament in London. At the same time, in the 2009/10 season, he was also leading Pick Szeged simultaneously.

After the Olympic Games, Djukic left Great Britain and in September 2012 became the head coach of the Israeli national team, at the head of which he remained until August 2015.

In the 2016/17 season, he led Maccabi Tel Aviv, with which he won the national cup and placed in the group phase of the EHF Cup, being the only Israeli team that has achieved it so far. 

In December 2016, he became the coach of Montenegro, at whose helm he remained until July 2018. With this selection, after successfully completing the qualifications, he participated in the European Championship in Zagreb in 2018.

From October 2018 to July 2019, he coached the women's team of CSM Bucharest, with whom he won the National cup and played in the 1/4 finals of the Champions League.

From 2019 to 2020 he held the position of sports director of all selections of the Handball Federation of Georgia.

And more recently, from 2021 to 2022 he coached Grundfos Tatabanya KC, Hungary with whom he participate in European Handball League.

He is currently the Head Coach of the Israeli National team

Achievements and recognitions 

 Champion and Cup Winner of North Macedonia with Vardar Vatrostalna 
 Cup Winner of Israel with Maccabi Tel Aviv
 Romanian Cup Winner with CSM Bucharest
 MEHL League winner with Pick Szeged (Hungary)
 1/2 of EHF CWC with “Vardar Vatrostalna” (North Macedonia)
 1/4 of Ch League with CSM Bucharest (Romania) 

He has been awarded different recognitions for his individual work as a coach: 

 The best youth coach by the Handball federation of the Republic of Yugoslavia in 1993; 
 Coach of the year in Aleksandrovac in 1993 and Lazarevac in 1995; 
 Coach of the century of the municipality of Aleksandrovac in 2000; 
 Coach of the year in Hungary in 2002; 

With "Zupa" in the 1994/95 season, he took place in the First Federal League of the Federal Republic of Yugoslavia, the highest level of competition, and was the champion of Serbia and Yugoslavia in the 1992/93 season with the younger selections of the same club.

Playing career 
In his playing career, he played for: "Zupa" Aleksandrovac, "Student" Kragujevac and "Goč" Vrnjačka Banja, all from Serbia. Very early, in 1986, he decided to dedicate himself to a coaching career and initially led as a coach and played in the same time for "Zupa".

References

 Djukic appointed new coach (“Eurosport”)
 GB handball coach Dragan Djukic to leave after Olympics ("BBC sport")
 GB handball coach Djukic quits to take charge of Israel ("Inside the games")
 Maccabi Tel Aviv appoints new coach Dragan Djukic ("Handball planet")
 Đukic new coach of Montenegro (“Hballtransfers”)
 Dragan Djukic is the new head coach for CSM Bucuresti ("Timeout" magazine) 
 3:2:1-Fachbuch das ehemaligen nationaltrainers Dragan Djukic ("Handball" Switzerland)

Living people
Serbian handball coaches
1962 births
People from Aranđelovac
Serbian expatriate sportspeople in Hungary
Serbian expatriate sportspeople in Montenegro
Serbian expatriate sportspeople in Romania